Nick Rizzuto is the producer of The Wilkow Majority radio program on Sirius Satellite Radio and co-founder of Conservative Punk. Although he is not heard on the air, he is regularly referred to by host Andrew Wilkow as simply Rizzuto.

On May 3, 2007, Rizzuto made his on-air debut to discuss his confrontation with Virgin Atlantic over their decision to offer controversial 9/11 conspiracy documentary Loose Change as part of their in-flight entertainment.

References
 http://hotair.com/archives/2007/05/03/virgin-atlantic-loose-change-update/

American radio producers
Living people
Year of birth missing (living people)